Preobrazhenovka is a rural locality (a selo) and the administrative center of Preobrazhenovsky Selsoviet of Zavitinsky District, Amur Oblast, Russia. The population was 175 as of 2018. There are 5 streets.

Geography 
Preobrazhenovka is located 8 km south of Zavitinsk (the district's administrative centre) by road. Zavitinsk is the nearest rural locality.

References 

Rural localities in Zavitinsky District